Luis Enrique Camejo (born January 19, 1971 in Pinar del Río) is a Cuban contemporary painter who won several prizes, including the First Place Prize in the V Painting Contest Nicomedes García Gomez in 2003. He lives and works in Havana today.

Studies 
Luis completed serious studies in the field of Plastic Arts. From 1982 to 1986, Luis Enrique Camejo attended the lessons of the Pinar del Río School of Art, before entering the National Art School in Havana from 1986 to 1990. Finally, he graduated from the Superior Art Institute of Havana (ISA) in 1996.

Since 1996, Luis teaches Plastic Arts at the Superior Art Institute of Havana.

Artistic style 
Luis Enrique Camejo's favourites themes are the relationship between man and his environment – especially urban environment at night – and time.

These themes are materialized by lights and colours effects such as blurring or dripping, in order to evocate the speed of modern times, with just some details clear in the vagueness like a tree or – paradoxically – a car.

Luis Enrique Camejo is a member of the Cuban Artists and Writers Organisation.

Awards 

2003
 First Place Prize in the V Painting Contest Nicomedes García Gomez, Segovia, Spain

2002
 Mention at the Fine Arts Salon of Pinar del Río, Pinar del Río, Cuba

1990
 Award from the Book Institute in Pinar del Río, Pinar del Río, Cuba
 Mention from the Fine Arts Salon of Pinar del Río, Pinar del Río, Cuba

Exhibitions

Selected solo exhibitions 
2008
 Vanishing, Luis Camejo y Pablo Soria, Pan American Art Projects, Miami, Florida.

2007
 Ciudad Móvil. Godoy World Art Gallery, Madrid, Spain.

2006
 Sueños. Livingstone Gallery, The Hague, Netherlands; Havana Gallery, Zurich, Switzerland.
 Sueño, IX Bienal de la Habana. Morro-Cabaña. Havana, Cuba.
 Sueño, City Gallery. Camagüey, Cuba.
 
2005
 Places, Galería Servando, Havana, Cuba.
 Tráfico, Livingstone Gallery, The Hague, Netherlands.

2004
 Transparencia, Galería Pequeño Espacio. C.N.A.P. Havana, Cuba.
 Déjà vu, Gallery 23 y 12, Havana, Cuba.

2003
 Landscapes, Art Center, Pinar del Río, Cuba.
 Landscapes, Art Center Ciego de Avila, Cuba.
 Paintings of Luis E. Camejo, San Francisco de Asis Convent, Havana, Cuba.
 VIII Havana Biennale, Havana, Cuba.

2002
 After the Rain, Gallery 106, Austin, Texas, USA.

2001
 Handmade, Gallery Acacia, Havana, Cuba.

1999
 Juntos pero no revueltos, Gallery Havana, Havana, Cuba.

Selected group exhibitions 
2008
 De Pinar… Epílogo visual, Galería Collage, Havana, Cuba.
 The first collection, AD HOD Gallery. Ontario, Canada.
 L.Cadalso, Luis E.Camejo, R.Mena : Intemporel, Paris, France.
 Mi isla es una ciudad, Triennale Bovisa, Milano, Italy.
 Gran subasta del MAC, Casacor, Panama City, Panama.
 Arteamericas, Miami Beach Convention Center, Miami, USA.
 CIRCA, Feria de Arte, San Juan, Puerto Rico.
 XVII Gran Subasta de Excelencias, Fundación San Felipe, Hotel Marriott, Panama.

2007
 Balelatina. Basel, Switzerland.
 Art Amsterdam, Amsterdam, Netherlands.
 IX Bienal de Cuenca, Cuenca, Ecuador.
 Art Madrid 2007, Madrid, Spain.
 Monstruos Devoradores de Energía, Casa de América. Madrid, Spain.
 Cosmos, Galería Habana, Havana, Cuba.
 Luz insular, Addison House Plaza, Panama City, Panama.
 A través del espejo: Arte Cubano Hoy, Galería Allegro, Panama City, Panama.
 
2006
 Relatos de viaje. Convento de San Francisco de Asís. Havana, Cuba.
 Manual de Instrucciones. Convento de Santa Clara. Havana, Cuba.
 Art Madrid 2006, Madrid, Spain.
 Subasta Fernando Durán, Madrid, Spain.
 2006 Art Auction. Corcoran Gallery of Art, Washington, D.C.
 Vedado, Galería 23 y 12, Havana, Cuba.
 KunstRAI 2006, Amsterdam, Netherlands.
 En Tránsito, Galería Villa Manuela, Havana, Cuba.
 Du Paysage aux experiences de L’homme, Planet Discovery Hall, Beirut, Lebanon.
 Ici et maintenant, Galerie Intemporel, Paris, France.
 
2005
 Art Fair Köln, Colonia, Germany.
 Espacios, Galería Espacios, Madrid, Spain.
 TIAFF 2005, Toronto International Art Fair, Convention Center, Toronto, Canada.
 Zomerbeelden, Livingstone Gallery, The Hague, Netherlands.
 KunstRAI, International Art Fair in Amsterdam, Netherlands.
 Cuba, The Next Generation, Center for  Cuban Studios, New York.
 Pintura Húmeda, Biblioteca Nacional José Martí, Havana, Cuba.
 El Arte de la Apropiación, Galería Servando, Havana, Cuba.

2004
 Cuba From The Inside, Looking Out, Elaine L. Jacob Gallery, Detroit.
 TIAF 2004, Metro Toronto Convention Center, Toronto, Canada.
 50 x 70, Havana Gallerie, Zürich, Switzerland.
 Die Magie des Gewöhnlichen, Havana Gallerie, Zürich, Switzerland.
 Es para no ser visto, Galería Praxis Internacional, Lima, Peru.
 Memoria, presente y utopia, Convento de San Francisco de Asís, Havana, Cuba.

References 
 http://www.havana-cultura.com

External links 
 http://www.medaid.org/www/art/artists/camejo/works.html
 http://www.artnet.com/Artists/ArtistHomePage.aspx?artist_id=424006761&page_tab=Artworks
 https://web.archive.org/web/20101023072545/http://www.panamericanart.com/bio/LuisEnriqueCamejo183.php

Cuban artists
Living people
1971 births